COWI A/S is an international consulting group, specialising in engineering, environmental science and economics, with headquarters in Lyngby, Denmark.

It has been involved in more than 50,000 projects in 175 countries and has approximately 7,300 employees, including engineers, biologists, geologists, economists, surveyors, anthropologists, sociologists and architects.

History
COWI was founded in 1930 by civil engineer Christen Ostenfeld. Wriborg W. Jønson became a partner 16 years later. From 1946 to 1973, the company operated as a partnership under the name of Chr. Ostenfeld & W. Jønson. The initials of the two senior partners lent the company its name.

In 1973, the company became foundation-owned enterprise and was renamed COWIconsult, Consulting Engineers and Planners AS. In 1995, the company changed its name to COWI Consulting Engineers and Planners AS, eventually becoming COWI A/S in 2001.

In 2008 the firm bought Flint & Neill, a UK civil and structural engineering consultancy specialising in bridges. In November 2014, the firm acquired Donaldson Associates Ltd, a UK base tunneling specialist company.  At the time of acquisition, Donaldson Associates Ltd had 150 staff, operating from 5 UK offices and one international office in Hong Kong. In November 2018, the firm acquired Arkitema Architects, a danish architecture firm.  At the time of acquisition, Arkitema Architects has 550 staff, operating from 5 offices in the nordics. Arkitema Architects is the largest acquisition of COWI to date.

Ownership
COWI Holding A/S is an unlisted Danish public limited liability company jointly owned by the COWIfonden (the COWIfoundation) holding 85% of shares with the remaining 15% of company shares held by current and former employees from eight countries where COWI operates. The company regards employee shareholders as co-owners. The current company structure was adapted in 2010.

See also
 Øresund Bridge
 Copenhagen Metro
 Great Belt Fixed Link
 Strait of Messina Bridge
 Çanakkale 1915 Bridge

References

External links

Official site (English)
In-depth company history (English)

International engineering consulting firms
Construction and civil engineering companies of Denmark
Service companies based in Copenhagen
Companies based in Lyngby-Taarbæk Municipality
Danish companies established in 1930
Construction and civil engineering companies established in 1930
Design companies established in 1930
Strait of Messina Bridge